Gora is a rural locality (a village) in Komyanskoye Rural Settlement, Gryazovetsky District, Vologda Oblast, Russia. The population was 18 as of 2002.

Geography 
Gora is located 34 km northeast of Gryazovets (the district's administrative centre) by road. Zimnyak is the nearest rural locality.

References 

Rural localities in Gryazovetsky District